Chennai district, formerly known as Madras district, is one of the 38 districts in the state of Tamil Nadu, India. It is the smallest and the most densely populated district in the state. The district is coterminous with the city of Chennai, which is administered by the Greater Chennai Corporation. It is surrounded by Tiruvallur district in the north and the west, Kanchipuram district in the south-west, Chenglpattu district in the south, and the Bay of Bengal in the east.

As of 2011, the district had a population of 4,646,732 with a sex-ratio of 989 females for every 1,000 males. Much of the district's population descended from its settlements in the 1st century CE to the Middle Ages, but the diversity has grown much since then. The district consists of only one civic body, the megacity of Chennai, which forms the core and the most notable portion of the much bigger Chennai metropolis, or officially, the Chennai Metropolitan Area. In 2018, the district's limits were expanded, aligning with that of the newly expanded Greater Chennai Corporation, which had annexed adjacent municipalities. The district is divided into three revenue divisions and ten taluks.

Etymology 

The name Chennai was derived from Damarla Chennappa Nayak, the father of a general of the Vijayanagar Empire.

Geography 
Chennai district covers an area of 426 km2 located on the Eastern Coastal Plains of India. It is situated on the northeastern corner of Tamil Nadu along the Coramandel coast, a region bounded by the Bay of Bengal and is surrounded inland by the districts of Tiruvallur, Kanchipuram and Chengalpattu. It lies between 12°59' and 13°9' of the northern latitude and 80°12' and 80°19' of the eastern longitude at an average altitude of 6 metres above sea level on a 'sandy shelving breaker swept' beach. Terrain slope varies from 1:5000 to 1:10,000. The terrain is very flat with contours ranging from 2 m to 10 m above mean sea level with a few isolated hillocks in the southwest beyond the district limits at St. Thomas Mount, Pallavaram and Tambaram.

The district runs inland in a rugged semi-circular fashion and its coastline is about 25.60 km (2.5% of the total coastline of Tamil Nadu). Because of its strategic location and economic importance, it is referred to as the "Gateway of South India." The drainage system includes two rivers, namely, Cooum (flowing in the northern part) and Adyar (flowing in the southern part), a canal (the Buckingham), and a stream (the Otteri Nullah) slicing the district into several islands.

The district falls under Seismic Zone III indicating a moderate risk of earthquake. Geologically the district is divided into three regions, namely, sandy, clayey and hard-rock regions. The soil comprises clay, shale and sandstone.

Of the total land area, reserved forests cover 2.71 km2 and is concentrated in and around the Guindy National Park region, one of the few national parks in the world located within a city. The forest cover of the district is as follows:

Climate 
Chennai has Tropical savanna climate (Köppen: Aw)

Demographics 
According to 2011 census, Chennai district had a population of 4,646,732 with a sex-ratio of 989 females for every 1,000 males, much above the national average of 929. Scheduled Castes and Scheduled Tribes accounted for 16.78% and 0.22% of the population respectively. The average literacy of the district was 81.27%, compared to the national average of 72.99%. With the expanded limits Chennai district had a population of 6,748,026.

The district had a total of 1,154,982 households. There were a total of 1,817,297 workers, comprising 10,210 cultivators, 10,251 main agricultural labourers, 29,143 in house hold industries, 1,569,950 other workers, 197,743 marginal workers, 4,244 marginal cultivators, 3,423 marginal agricultural labourers, 8,202 marginal workers in household industries and 181,874 other marginal workers.

Religion

Language

Administration and politics

In 2013, five taluks on the district were split to create five new ones: Velachery, Purasawalkam, Ayanavaram, Aminjikarai and Guindy.

In January 2018, the state government announced that the district will be expanded to match the boundaries of the Greater Chennai Corporation. This will integrate six additional taluks from Tiruvallur and Kanchipuram districts into the Chennai district. The new divisions and taluks of the district will be:

Revenue divisions and taluks 
 North Chennai Revenue Division, headquartered at Tondiarpet, contains taluks of Tiruvottiyur, Madhavaram, Perambur, Tondiarpet, and Purasaiwalkam.
 Central Chennai Revenue Division, headquartered at Ambattur, contains the taluks of Mambalam, Egmore, Aminjikarai, Ayanavaram, Ambattur, and Maduravoyal.
 South Chennai Revenue Division, headquartered at Guindy, contains the taluks of Mylapore, Guindy, Velachery, Alandur, and Sholinganallur.

Members of Parliament

Politics 

|}

See also 

 Chennai Metropolitan Area
 Districts of Tamil Nadu
 Mumbai City district
 Kolkata district
 National Capital Territory of Delhi

Notes

References

External links 

 Chennai District

 
Districts of Tamil Nadu